Daniel "Tiger" Schulmann (born July 2, 1962) is an American Kyokushin karateka and mixed martial arts trainer.

Biography
Schulmann began training in the martial arts in kyokushin karate at the age of six in New York City. He trained and competed throughout the United States, and internationally in Japan and Israel. As an adult, he has trained in grappling, boxing, kickboxing, and other martial arts disciplines.

After completing his career as a fighter, he opened his first training center in 1984, known as United American Karate ( UAK), in Quakertown, Pennsylvania. Over time the name of his style changed first to Tiger Schulmann's Karate (TSK), then to Tiger Schulmann's Mixed Martial Arts (TSMMA) and finally to Tiger Schulmann's Martial Arts (TSMA).

Professional career
Schulmann was the North American Mas Oyama Full-Contact Karate Champion for six consecutive years (1979–1984). In 1979, he was also the United States representative in the World Open Full-Contact Karate Championships in Tokyo. He was the youngest fighter, one of only eight fighters chosen nationwide. Schulmann was inducted into the North American Grappling Association Hall of Fame as a founding member in 2005 and the New Jersey Martial Arts Hall of Fame with the “Lifetime Achievement Award” in 2013.

Tiger Schulmann's Martial Arts
Tiger Schulmann's Martial Arts (TSMA) has 52 schools in five states.

At TSMA, students are taught self-defense, including submission grappling (jiujitsu), and a hybrid style of kyokushin and kickboxing. Some TSMA students have competed in national MMA-style events such as in the UFC and for Bellator MMA.

The company is headquartered in Elmwood Park, New Jersey.

References

External links
 TSK.com

1962 births
Living people
American male karateka
Kyokushin kaikan practitioners
Karate coaches
Mixed martial arts trainers
Sportspeople from New York City
20th-century American Jews
21st-century American Jews